Ansett may refer to:

Ansett Australia defunct airline
Ansett New Zealand, defunct airline
Ansett Pioneer, defunct Australian coach line
Reg Ansett, founder of Ansett Australia
Richard Ansett photographer